Ajax Downs is a Quarter Horse race track located in Ajax, Ontario, a suburb east of Toronto, Ontario, Canada. Opened in 1969 as "Picov Downs" the name was changed in 2006 with the establishment of a new slot-machine gaming facility. The slots facility is known as Casino Ajax. A full  oval racetrack was completed in 2009. Racing is held at the track from May through October.

Alex Picov came from Ukraine in 1921 and is widely credited for establishing Quarter Horse racing in Ontario. The Picov family settled in Ajax, Ontario where the Picov family's passion turned to riding horses, primarily Quarter horses. The Picovs moved the majority of Quarter Horses coming into Canada during the 1960s and 1970s.
 
The Picovs built the Picov Downs, which opened in 1969. The location for the track was part of the family farm. Many of Canada’s top jockeys started their careers on the old "J-track". The track was re-name in 2006 to Ajax Downs with the creation of the new slots facility. A six-furlong (1 furlong = 1/8th of a mile, 660ft, 220yards, or 201.1 meters) oval racetrack was completed in 2009. The track is still operated by the Picov family, while the casino is operated by Great Canadian Gaming.

Ajax Downs is home to many stakes races, including qualifying events for the AQHA Bank of America Racing Challenge program. The Alex Picov Memorial is run yearly at Ajax Downs. It is the richest Quarter horse race in Canada. In addition, many race days have special events and fundraisers.

External links
 Ajax Downs

Horse racing venues in Ontario
Casinos in Ontario
Ajax, Ontario